The 52 incumbent members of the Parliament of Vanuatu were elected on 19–20 March 2020.

List of members

References

 2020
Vanuatu